Nelly Degouy (16 March 1910 – 28 November 1979) was a Belgian painter. Her work was part of the painting event in the art competition at the 1932 Summer Olympics.

References

1910 births
1979 deaths
20th-century Belgian painters
Belgian women painters
Olympic competitors in art competitions
Artists from Antwerp